SWEEPS-04 is an extrasolar planet orbiting the star SWEEPS J175853.92−291120.6 in the constellation Sagittarius approximately 27,710 light years away (based on a distance modulus of 14.1) from the Solar System, making it (along with SWEEPS-11) the most distant exoplanet(s) known. This planet was found in 2006 by the Sagittarius Window Eclipsing Extrasolar Planet Search (SWEEPS) program that uses the transit method.

The upper limit on the planet's mass is 3.8 times the mass of Jupiter. The best fit radius is 0.81 times that of Jupiter, but the uncertainty in this value is large, around 12%. It orbits at an average distance of 8,200,000 km (0.055 AU) from the parent star, taking 4.2 days to revolve around it.

See also
 Sagittarius Window Eclipsing Extrasolar Planet Search or SWEEPS
 SWEEPS-10
 SWEEPS-11
 List of extrasolar planets

References

External links
 

Sagittarius (constellation)
Transiting exoplanets
Hot Jupiters
Giant planets
Exoplanets discovered in 2006
Sagittarius Window Eclipsing Extrasolar Planet Search
Exoplanet candidates